is a monorail train station on the Shōnan Monorail Enoshima Line located in Fujisawa, Kanagawa Prefecture, Japan. It is the southern terminus of the Shōnan Monorail Enoshima Line and is located 6.6 kilometers from the northern terminus at Ōfuna Station.

History
Shōnan-Enoshima Station was opened on July 1, 1971 as part of the second phase of construction of the line, which extended its terminus from Shōnan-Fukasawa Station.

Renovation works on the station took place between July and December 2018. Along with a refreshed exterior, new escalators and elevators were built to connect the ground floor with the fifth floor, where the monorail departs from. An open terrace at the top of the building provides an overlook of the area, with Sagami Bay and Mt. Fuji visible on a clear day.

Lines
Shōnan Monorail Company Ltd
Enoshima Line

Station layout
Shōnan-Enoshima Station is an elevated station with single bay platform serving one track for bi-directional traffic. The platform is located on the 5th floor of a five-story station building, with the exit wickets on the 4th floor.

Adjacent stations

Surrounding area and transfer
  Enoshima Station (Enoshima Electric Railway)
  Katase-Enoshima Station (Odakyu Enoshima Line)
 Enoshima

References

External links
Shonan Monorail home page 

Railway stations in Kanagawa Prefecture
Railway stations in Japan opened in 1971
Shonan Monorail Enoshima Line
Railway stations in Fujisawa, Kanagawa
Stations of Shonan Monorail